Kilju Ch'ŏngnyŏn station is a railway station in Kilju-ŭp, Kilju county, North Hamgyŏng province, North Korea. It is the junction point of the Paektusan Ch'ŏngnyŏn and P'yŏngra lines of the Korean State Railway.

Originally called Kilju station (Chosŏn'gŭl: 길주역; Hanja: 吉州駅), the station, along with the rest of the Kilju–Hapsu section, was opened by the Government Railways of Chosen (朝鮮総督府鉄道) on 1 November 1933.

On 9 October 2006 an underground nuclear test was conducted at P'unggye-ri in Kilju County, causing the closure of the line for 3–4 months.

There is a pulp mill and a plywood factory in Kilju that receive raw logs via trains from the Paektusan Ch'ŏngnyŏn line.

References

Railway stations in North Korea
Railway stations opened in 1933